The Most Beautiful Legs of Berlin (German: Die schönsten Beine von Berlin) is a 1927 German silent film directed by Willi Wolff and starring Ellen Richter, Dina Gralla and Kurt Gerron. The film's sets were designed by the art director Ernst Stern. It functions as a revue show, showcasing leading dancers of the Weimar era. Richter and Gralla play rival competitors.

A theme song composed by Walter Kollo was released alongside the film, and became a gramophone hit record.

Cast

References

External links

Films of the Weimar Republic
German silent feature films
Films directed by Willi Wolff
German black-and-white films
UFA GmbH films
Films set in Berlin